Vasile Simiocencu (born January 8, 1947) is a Romanian sprint canoeist who competed in the 1970s. He won seven medals at the ICF Canoe Sprint World Championships with a gold (K-4 10000 m: 1971), two silvers (K-4 500 m: 1977, K-4 10000 m: 1975), and four bronzes (K-1 4 x 500 m: 1973, K-2 1000 m: 1971, K-2 10000 m: 1970, K-4 10000 m: 1973).

Simiocencu also competed in two Summer Olympics, earning his best finish of fourth in the K-4 1000 m event at Montreal in 1976.

References

External links
 

1947 births
Canoeists at the 1972 Summer Olympics
Canoeists at the 1976 Summer Olympics
Living people
Olympic canoeists of Romania
Romanian male canoeists
Romanian people of Russian descent
ICF Canoe Sprint World Championships medalists in kayak